Tales from the Vienna Woods (German: G'schichten aus dem Wienerwald) is a 1934 Austrian musical film directed by Georg Jacoby and starring Magda Schneider, Wolf Albach-Retty and Leo Slezak. The title refers to the waltz Tales from the Vienna Woods by Johann Strauss.

Cast
Magda Schneider as Milly Scheffers 
Wolf Albach-Retty as Graf Rudi von Waldheim 
Leo Slezak as Alois Jeremias Schopf 
Georg Alexander as Prince Kiriloff 
Truus Van Aalten as Mary Limford 
Oscar Sabo as Pomeisl 
Henry Lorenzen as Bobby Limford 
Lotte Lang
Herbert Hübner
Eduard Loibner
Karl Zeska
Karl Bachmann
Karl Kneidinger

Reception
Writing for Night and Day in 1937, Graham Greene gave the film a poor review, complaining primarily about the acting of Magda Schneider. Greene claimed that Slezak's "magnificent buffoonery tries to save the film," but Greene concluded that "Austrian films are born dead: horrible bright fakes from a ruined country, libellous laughter".

References

External links

Austrian musical films
Austrian black-and-white films
1934 musical films
Films directed by Georg Jacoby